"Didn't We" is a song written by Troy Seals and Graham Lyle, and recorded by American country music artist Lee Greenwood.  It was released in August 1986 as the first single from the album Love Will Find Its Way to You.  The song reached number 10 on the Billboard Hot Country Singles & Tracks chart.

The song was already performed in 1970 by Gene Ammons on his album Brother Jug!

Chart performance
"Didn't We" debuted at number 58 on the U.S. Billboard Hot Country Singles & Tracks for the week of August 9, 1986.

References

1986 singles
Lee Greenwood songs
Songs written by Troy Seals
Songs written by Graham Lyle
MCA Records singles
Song recordings produced by Jerry Crutchfield
1986 songs